Dhofar Sports, Cultural and Social Club (commonly known as Dhofar Club, nicknamed locally as Al-Zaeem, or "The Leader(s)" because of their great success, or just plainly as Dhofar) is an Omani sports club based in Salalah, Oman. The club is currently playing in the Oman Professional League, top division of Omani football. Their home ground is Al-Saada Stadium, but they also recognize the older Salalah Sports Complex as their home ground. Both stadiums are government owned, but they also own their own personal stadium and sports equipment, as well as their own training facilities.

History
The idea for the foundation of a club in Salalah began in the 1960s resulting in various meetings among the town's people. The names considered for the new club were Al-Ahlia, Al-Nahda, Al-Arabi, and Al-Shoala, but the name to be chosen for the club was to be "Al-Shaab", a name literally translating to "The People", and in 1968 the new club was finally founded.

Two years later the young club merged with the neighboring club Al-Shoala from the Dahariz district of Salalah and was re-founded as Dhofar in 1970 appointing Salim Al-Kathiri as the club's first president, a position which was held by him till 1975. Officially, the club was founded on 20 May 1972 and was registered on 26 June 2002.

Dhofar is the most successful club in the Omani League with a total of eleven championships and ten Sultan Qaboos Cup titles to their name. Dhofar have also reached the final of the 1995–1996 Gulf Club Champions Cup, only losing to Saudi giants, Al-Nassr. The club has never been relegated to second division. They have a long lasting rivalry with neighbours Al-Nasr S.C. Although being relatively younger in foundation than many other Arab clubs, which generally were founded in the 1930s, 1940s and 1950s, Dhofar has been ranked as the 30th most successful club title-wise in the Arab World with a total of 19 titles.

Dhofar, along with the neighbours Al-Nasr have been generally labelled as the front runners of the Omani League, but as seen in the recent seasons, both the clubs performed horribly with Dhofar losing many games, and not going far in the Sultan Qaboos Cup, along with Al-Nasr who even got relegated in the 2010–11 season.

The club in the 2009–10 season made a season comeback with their performances in the Sultan Qaboos Cup by reaching the final against a lower-leveled Saham. Saham won the match 7–6 on penalties after the match had ended 2–2 at normal time.

Dhofar also received second place in the 2009–10 Omani League losing only a few points short of first-time winners, Al-Suwaiq, and in the process qualified for the 2011 AFC Cup. After the end of the second-place finish earlier in the 2009–10 season, Dhofar made major signings and re-signings to boost the club's performance in future competitions. Then in the next season, they were placed 4th in the league table securing 30 points from 22 games. Dhofar lost all its last 5 matches in the 2010–11 season. It further went down in the 2011–12 season and was placed 12th in the league. But at the end of the same season they also won their 8th Sultan Qaboos Cup title by winning 1–0 against neighbours Al-Ittihad. In the previous season of the Omani League, Dhofar was ranked 6th in the league. This was one of their worst performances in the top division football. In 2013, Dhofar appointed Dragan Talajić of Croatia as their manager.

Before the beginning of the 2014-15 Oman Professional League season, on 4 July 2014 the club appointed Romanian manager Petre Gigiu who had managed Al-Seeb Club and Sur SC in the 2013–14 Oman Professional League. His first triumph as a manager of the club came in the pre-season preparations of the club when he led his side to win the 2014 Baniyas SC International Tournament winning two matches, 2–1 against United Arab Emirates national under-23 football team and 1–0 against Bahraini Premier League club Hidd SCC.

Other sports
Although being mainly known for their football, Dhofar S.C.S.C. like many other clubs in Oman, have not only football in their list, but also hockey, volleyball, handball, basketball, badminton and squash. They also have a youth football team competing in the Omani Youth league.

Crest and colours

Like the Oman national football team, Dhofar S.C.S.C. have also long-chosen red as the color to represent them, varying themselves from neighbors Al-Ittihad (Green), Al-Nasr S.C.S.C. (Blue) and Salalah SC (Blue) kits. Historically, they usually wore a red jersey with white shorts, but after the 1990s they began to wear a full red kit.

Over the years, they have had numerous kit providers, ranging from Puma to Lotto and Grand Sport. As of now, Nike provides them with kits. Currently, Oasis Grace L.L.C. is featured on the team's shirt.

They have also had many different sponsors over the years, but rarely featured a shirt sponsor (only during notable matches such as the Sultan Qaboos Cup final). Omani newspaper, Al-Watan, Dhofar Insurance, Al Makan Cafe and Bank Muscat have all been featured on their kit at one point in their history.

Honours

National titles

Oman Professional League (11):
Winners 1982–83, 1984–85, 1989–90, 1991–92, 1992–93, 1993–94, 1998–99, 2000–01, 2004–05, 2016–17, 2018–19
Runners-up 1987–88, 2002–03, 2007–08, 2009–10, 2019–20

Sultan Qaboos Cup (10):
Winners 1977, 1980, 1981, 1990, 1999, 2004, 2006, 2011, 2019–20, 2020–21
Runners-up 1984, 1993, 2009

Oman Professional League Cup (2):
Winners 2012–13, 2018–19
Runners-up 2014–15

Oman Super Cup (3):
Winners 1999, 2017, 2019
Runners-up 2000, 2005, 2012

Youth and friendly
Gulf Club Champions Cup U-17 (1):
Winners 1994
Bani Yas International Tournament (1):
Winners 2014

Club performance: international competitions

AFC competitions
Asian Club Championship : 2 appearances
1986 : Qualifying round
1996–97 : First round
Asian Cup Winners' Cup : 1 appearance
1991–92 : Second round
AFC Cup : 6 appearances
2004: Group stage
2007: Group stage
2013: Group stage
2018: Group stage
2020: Group stage
2022: Group stage

UAFA competitions
Arab Champions League : 1 appearance
2008–09 : Round of 32
2019–20 : Round of 32
GCC Champions League: 10 appearances
1982 : 6th Position
1986 : 3rd Position
1991 : 4th Position
1994 : 6th Position
1995 : Runners-up
1995 : Runners-up
2001 : 3rd Position
2002 : 5th Position
2008 : Group stage
2011 : Quarter-Finals

Players

First-team squad

Personnel

Technical staff

Management

Presidential history
Below is the official presidential history of Dhofar S.C.S.C., from when Salim Annou Al-Kathiri took over at the club in 1970, until the present day.

References

External links
Dhofar S.C.S.C. Profile at Soccerway.com
Dhofar S.C.S.C. Profile at Goalzz.com

Football clubs in Oman
Oman Professional League
Salalah
Association football clubs established in 1970
1970 establishments in Oman